The Norfolk County Council election took place across Norfolk on 2 May 2013, coinciding with local elections for all county councils in England. The results were announced the following day, Friday 3 May 2013. The result brought to an end 12 years of Conservative administration, who finished three seats short of a majority after losing 20 seats, leaving the Council in no overall control (NOC). UKIP and the Labour Party both made gains of 14 and 11 seats respectively. The Liberal Democrats and the Green Party both lost three seats each, whilst an independent won a single seat in North Norfolk.

Previous composition

2009 election

Composition of council seats before election

Changes between elections

In between the 2009 election and the 2013 election, the following council seats changed hands:

Summary of Results

|-bgcolor=#F6F6F6
| colspan=2 style="text-align: right; margin-right: 1em" | Total
| style="text-align: right;" | 84
| colspan=5 |
| style="text-align: right;" | 215,465
| style="text-align: right;" | 
|-

Gains and Losses
The Conservative Party suffered net a net loss of 20 seats (22 losses and 2 gains); Liberal Democrats a net loss of 3 seats (4 losses and 1 gain); the Green Party lost 3 seats, finishing with four in total. UKIP made 14 gains to become the official opposition, while Labour gained 11 seats, and 1 seat was gained by an independent.

The Conservatives lost one seat (Hevingham & Spixworth) to the Liberal Democrats in Broadland, one to an Independent candidate (North Coast) in King's Lynn and West Norfolk, 7 seats to Labour (Caister-on-Sea, Yarmouth North & Central, Clenchwarton & King's Lynn South, Gaywood South, King's Lynn North & Central, Bowthorpe and Catton Grove), as well as losing 13 seats to UKIP (Dereham South, Swaffham, Thetford East, Watton,  Breydon, East Flegg, Gorleston St Andrews, Lothingland, Gayton & Nar Valley, Gaywood North & Central, Marshland North, Holt and Melton Constable).

The Liberal Democrats lost two seats to the Conservatives (Fakenham and Mundesley, both in North Norfolk), one seat to UKIP in Breckland (Thetford West) and one to Labour covering several city wards in the Norwich district (Lakenham).

The Green Party lost three seats to Labour in Norwich (Mile Cross, Sewell and Town Close).

Incumbent councillors
A total of 55 incumbent councillors were defending their seats for the same party they had stood for in 2009 (or in one of the five subsequent by-election). 41 were successful in retaining their seats, while 14 were not.

41 incumbent Conservative County Councillors were defending their seats at this election, including Judy Leggett (Old Catton), Judith Virgo (Humbleyard) and Barry Stone (Lothingland) who had won their seats in by-elections. Of these 41, 28 were re-elected while the other 13 lost their seats (9 to UKIP, 3 to Labour, 1 to the Liberal Democrats). All 5 Liberal Democrat incumbents held their seats. The Green Party had 3 incumbents defending seats; two were retained, while one was lost to Labour. Labour incumbents successfully defended all 5 of their seats (two of which they had won in by-elections - Susan Whitaker in Lakenham division and Alexandra Kemp (née Kampourpoulos) in Clenchwarton and King's Lynn South division). UKIP's single councillor retained his seat.

Incumbents who stood for other parties or as independents (such as former Conservative Jon Herbert in Forehoe) are not counted in these figures.

Group leaders
Bill Borrett (Elmham & Mattishall) was re-elected unopposed as the Conservative group leader, George Nobbs (Crome) was re-elected unopposed as the leader of the Labour Group.  The Liberal Democrats elected Dr Marie Strong (Wells) as their new group leader, replacing Mike Brindle who did not stand in this election. Richard Bearman (Mancroft) continued as the leader of the Green Party group. Richard Toby Coke (Gayton & Nar Valley) was selected as the UKIP group leader.

Turnout
The overall turnout at the election was 32.14% (215,465 votes, out of a total electorate of 670,383). The turnout in each division ranged form 18.09% in King's Lynn North & Central to 50.75% in Holt.

Council Leader Election

With the council now being in no overall control it was unclear who would be elected Leader. In the event, at the initial election for Council Leader on 13 May 2013, the Conservatives lost by 40 votes to 43.

After the initial vote, a "rainbow" alliance was formed between Labour, UKIP, The Liberal Democrats with support from the Green Party. Under the agreement, the existing cabinet system would be abolished and replaced by a new committee system with Labour councillor George Nobbs to be nominated to be Leader. On 27 May he was elected by a vote of 42 to 38.

Aftermath

Tom FitzPatrick (Fakenham) replaced Bill Borrett as Conservative group leader on 1 May 2014, however less than 10 months later he was successfully challenged by Cliff Jordan (Yare & All Saints) in the following March.

The 'Rainbow Alliance' of UKIP, Labour, and the Liberal Democrats with support from the Greens ran the Council until May 2016, with George Nobbs being re-elected by 43 votes to 40 in 2014, and by 42 to 39 in 2015. However, on 9 May 2016 the Alliance collapsed when the Green Party withdrew its support and abstained in the election for Leader, and Conservative Cliff Jordan won by 41 votes to 37. This enabled the Conservatives to run the Council through a minority administration until the local elections in May 2017.

Candidates by party

Both the Conservatives and Labour fielded a full slate of 84 candidates, UKIP stood 70 candidates, the Liberal Democrats stood 62, the Green Party stood 43, and there were 21 other candidates (including 3 for the Christian Peoples Alliance, 1 for the United People's Party and 17 independents).

Compared to 2009, UKIP had 52 more candidates, there were 6 more independent candidates than 2009, the Conservatives and Labour had the same number, the Liberal Democrats had 7 fewer candidates and the Green Party had 8 fewer candidates. The British National Party did not stand any candidates, compared to the 7 they stood in the previous election. In total, there were 44 more candidates than in 2009.

Candidates and results by division
Below are the results of the election, separated into the 7 districts and 84 divisions.

Breckland

District Summary

Division Results

Broadland

District Summary

Division Results

Great Yarmouth

District Summary

Division Results

King's Lynn and West Norfolk

District Summary

Division Results

North Norfolk

District Summary

Division Results

Norwich

District Summary

Division Results

South Norfolk

District Summary

Division Results

Notes

References

2013 English local elections
2013
2010s in Norfolk